Făclia (The Torch in English) (between 1989 and 2007 Adevărul de Cluj) is a daily newspaper published in Cluj-Napoca. The paper was among the official publications of the Cluj Region People Council and Party Committee during the communist era.

References

External links
Official site
WorldCat record

Newspapers published in Cluj-Napoca
Publications with year of establishment missing
Romanian-language newspapers
Communist newspapers